Poslednikovo is a rural locality (a selo) in Pushtulimsky Selsoviet, Yeltsovsky District, Altai Krai, Russia. The population was 128 as of 2013. There are 3 streets.

Geography 
Poslednikovo is located 29 km southeast of Yeltsovka (the district's administrative centre) by road. Bakhta is the nearest rural locality.

References 

Rural localities in Yeltsovsky District